Ariano Irpino (formerly Ariano di Puglia or simply Ariano) is an Italian city and municipality in the province of Avellino, in the Campania region.

Geography

Overview
It is 39 km east of Benevento, 51 km north-east of Avellino and 62 km south-west of Foggia.

Formerly called just Ariano, it was built on three hills, and for that reason it is also known as Città del Tricolle ("City of the Three Knolls"). From the Norman era, but formally only since 1868 to 1930, it was known as Ariano di Puglia. Irpinia is the name given to the area of the Apennine Mountains between Campania and Apulia; the name stems from the Oscan word hirpus, meaning wolf.

Ariano lies in the centre of a fertile but rugged district and has only a few buildings of historical importance, as it was devastated by earthquakes in 988, 1456 and 1732.

Towering over the surrounding countryside, the town was a military position of some importance in the Middle Ages, and it still has a Catholic diocese and retains many public offices and utilities which serve all surrounding smaller towns too. However, many inhabitants reside in farms and still live on agriculture or craftsmanship.

Ariano Irpino experiences a warm-summer Mediterranean climate (Csb/Cfb in the Köppen climate classification), with moderate rain, occasional snow and quite rare hail.

Surroundings
The municipality borders Apice (BN), Castelfranco in Miscano (BN), Flumeri, Greci, Grottaminarda, Melito Irpino, Montecalvo Irpino, Monteleone di Puglia (FG), Savignano Irpino, Villanova del Battista and Zungoli.

History
However, soon later Aequum Tuticum dramatically declined following the onset of the barbarian invasions.

As a result of this, the three hills started to be inhabited, a high and easily defendable place, and it is here that Ariano proper was born, a fortified city in a strategic position; however its ancient and formidable defensive walls are hardly recognizable today. In a secure place away from the invasions of the Goths and Byzantines, Ariano is a fortified town of the Lombards.

Successively conquered by the Normans, in 1140 it was the place where the king Roger II of Sicily promulgated the Assizes of Ariano, the then-new constitution of the Kingdom of Sicily. This legal corpus would be adopted almost complete and with a few variations into the Constitutions of Melfi of the Emperor Frederick II. In the same venue Roger II minted the ducat, a coin that would last for seven centuries, until 1860.

In 1255, Manfred, son of Frederick II, besieged the city, which resisted strongly thanks to its walls and the combative nature of its inhabitants. During the siege, a group of soldiers from Lucera pretended to be deserters from Manfred's army, and were welcomed into the town. During the night, they revealed their identity, sacking and destroying the city with fire, and killing or deporting many inhabitants. There is still a road marking the event, called La Carnale (The Carnage).

All these events are commemorated every year (in August) in the Rievocazione Storica del Dono delle Sante Spine (Historical Reinvocation of the Gift of the Sacred Thorns) and the reproduction of the Incendio del Campanile (Belltower Burning), a pyrotechnic event that lights the main square of the city and the side of the cathedral.

After the Capetian House of Anjou lost control of Sicily to Peter III of Aragon in the War of the Sicilian Vespers, the city passed to the Provençal family of Sabran from 1294 to 1413; and then into the hands of the Carafa family and the House of Gonzaga. Today are there still in the town buildings that belonged to the Spanish families that governed at the time. On 2 August 1545 the city rebelled against the feudal regime and became a Città Regia (city-state) dependent on the Viceroy of the Kingdom of Sicily.

Culture

Majolica

Ariano is known for the production of majolica, a tin-glazed pottery. The first examples date from the 13th century under the Moorish influence of the Spanish, but  became more refined around the 18th century, when the first amphorae and pitchers appear, often simple in the shape, but thinly elaborated. Today's production is even large, including flask, busts, cups, plates, figures, and amphorae. All pieces are splendidly decorated by the craftsmen of Ariano, and often have a fine and elaborate shape.

Museums

Today the town houses some museums:
 the City Museum and Ceramics Gallery

Research activity

Food
Ariano Irpino's country-people produce food from traditional agriculture.

Dialect 
Ariano Irpino is home to the Arianese dialect, a variety of the Irpinian dialect.

Health 

 was built in 1972 as a utility for the Campanian health district No. 1, that includes 29 municipalities with a total population of 87,993.
Actually an ancient Hospitalis pro Peregrinis et Infirmis, along with a pavilion for lepers, was founded thereabout in 1410, but it was relocated in 1731 in the neighboring St. Jacob Palace, where today is the  scientific and educational center.

In the north-eastern outskirts of the town there is also the headquarters of MIR (Medicinal Investigational Research), a department of BioGeM University Consortium that is involved in medical and pharmaceutical research.

Transport 

The  connects the town to A16 (Naples-Bari motorway) Grottaminarda junction and A14 (Bologna-Taranto highway) Foggia junction.

From  (located 6 km away from the town centre), daily trains reach Rome in 3h30, and Bari in 2 hours. The nearest airport is Naples-Capodichino airport, linked to Ariano Irpino by Air busses; these also reach the towns of Avellino, Benevento and Foggia.

People

Ottone Frangipane (1040-1127), saint
Saint Elzéar of Sabran (1285-1323), Count of Ariano
Hieronymus Angerianus (1470-1535), humanist
Diomede Carafa (1492-1560), bishop and cardinal
 Pietro Paolo Parzanese (1809-1852), poet
 Ortensio Zecchino (b. 1943), academic and politician
Luca Morelli (b. 1987), motorcycle racer

See also
Aequum Tuticum
Assizes of Ariano
BioGeM
Ariano Irpino Cathedral
Diocese of Ariano Irpino-Lacedonia
City Museum and Ceramics Gallery (Ariano Irpino)

References

External links

 Official website 
Città di Ariano 

 
Cities and towns in Campania
Hilltowns in Campania